John Reed may refer to:

Arts, letters, and entertainment
John Reed (actor) (1916–2010), English actor and singer with the D'Oyly Carte Opera Company
John Reed (animator) (1908–1992), American animator and painter
John Reed (art patron) (1901–1981), Australian critic and art patron
John Reed (journalist) (1887–1920), American journalist and Communist activist
John Reed (novelist) (born 1969), American novelist and author
John O. Reed (1929–2012), British anthologist and translator of African literature
John Shelton Reed (born 1942), American sociologist and essayist

Business and finance
John Reed, American miner, founder of the Reed Gold Mine in North Carolina
John S. Reed (born 1939), American financier
John Shedd Reed (1917–2008), American chairman of Santa Fe Industries, president of Shedd Aquarium
John T. Reed, American real estate investor and author

Politics
Sir John Blake-Reed (1882–1966), British judge
Jack Reed (Rhode Island politician) (born 1949), United States Senator from Rhode Island
John Reed (1633–1730), American politician, member of the Connecticut House of Representatives from Norwalk
John Reed (judge) (1864–1955), New Zealand judge
John Reed Jr. (1781–1860), American politician from Massachusetts, son of John Reed Sr. (below), entered Congress in 1813
John Reed Sr. (1751–1831), American politician from Massachusetts, left Congress in 1801
John A. Reed Jr. (1931–2015), American lawyer and judge
John H. Reed (1921–2012), American politician, 66th governor of Maine

Sports
 Jack Reed (baseball) (born 1933), American outfielder for the New York Yankees, 1961–1963
 John M. Reed (c. 1881 – 1934), American college sports coach
 John Reed (footballer) (born 1972), English footballer who played primarily for Sheffield United
 Johnny Reed, American baseball player

Others
John Reed (early Californian) (1805–1843), American early California settler and noted landowner in Marin County
John Reed (fur trader) (died 1814), American fur trader
John Reed (priest) (born 1951), English Archdeacon of Taunton
John C. Reed (born 1958), American medical researcher
John Oren Reed (1856–1916), American physicist and university dean
John W. Reed (1918–2018), American law professor and dean

See also 
 John Reed Swanton (1873–1958), American anthropologist, folklorist, and linguist
 Jack Reed (disambiguation)
 John Reid (disambiguation)
 John Read (disambiguation)
 John Rede (disambiguation)
 John Reade (disambiguation)